Aleko Mulos, also written Moullos, was an Ottoman gymnast. He competed in the men's artistic individual all-around event at the 1908 Summer Olympics. Out of 96 competitors, he shared the 67th place with Norwegian gymnast John Skrataas. During the Olympics, the Ottoman Empire was referred to as Turkey. It was the first recognized appearance of the Ottoman State, though at least two athletes from Smyrna had previously competed for Greece in 1896.

References

Turkish male artistic gymnasts
Gymnasts at the 1908 Summer Olympics
Olympic gymnasts of Turkey
Year of birth missing
Year of death missing